Ectobius sylvestris, known generally as the forest cockroach or lesser cockroach, is a species of cockroach in the family Ectobiidae. It is found in Europe and Northern Asia (excluding China), North America, and temperate Asia.

Subspecies
These two subspecies belong to the species Ectobius sylvestris:
 Ectobius sylvestris discrepans Adelung, 1917
 Ectobius sylvestris sylvestris (Poda, 1761)

References

Further reading

External links

 

Cockroaches
Articles created by Qbugbot
Insects described in 1761
Taxa named by Nikolaus Poda von Neuhaus